The following is the complete filmography of American actor Michael Madsen.

Film

Television

Music video

Video games

References 

Male actor filmographies
American filmographies